Hollywood Party may refer to:

Hollywood Party (1934 film), a musical starring Jimmy Durante
Hollywood Party (1937 film), a Charley Chase Technicolor short unseen for nearly 60 years until the soundtrack disc was rediscovered in 2000
Hollywood Party, an alternate title for The Party, a 1968 comedy written and directed by Blake Edwards, starring Peter Sellers